Edward Percy Blow (16 November 1877 – 9 March 1938), known as Percy, Corky, or Corkie Blow, was an English professional footballer who made 162 appearances in the Football League playing for Lincoln City. He also played non-league football in the Lincolnshire area. He played as a left half. While still a boy, he was honoured by the Royal Humane Society for saving the life of another child.

Life and career
Blow was born in Lincoln, Lincolnshire, the second son of Thomas Blow, a wheelwright, and his wife Anna. As an 11-year-old, he received the Bronze Medal of the Royal Humane Society, "awarded to people who have put their own lives at great risk to save or attempt to save someone else", after an incident in Boultham, Lincoln, in January 1889. The Nottinghamshire Guardian reported that The 1891 Census records the 13-year-old Blow living in Lincoln with his parents and six siblings and working in a skin yard alongside his brother Thomas, a year older.

The 23-year-old Blow had been working as a journeyman joiner and playing football for Lincoln team Blue Star when he joined his local professional club, Lincoln City. He made his senior debut in the last match of the 1900–01 Football League season, a 2–0 defeat away to Glossop in the Second Division. He became a regular member of the first team for the next five years; in April 1902, the Daily Express commented on how, despite the absence of Blow and fellow half-back Will Gibson, Lincoln "pressed continuously during the first half" and beat Bristol City 1–0. He scored just once in nationally organised competition, but did contribute the winning goal against Grimsby Town in the 1904 Lincolnshire Cup semi-final (Lincoln lost the final to Gainsborough Trinity). Blow's 180th and last appearance came in the penultimate game of the 1905–06 season, after which he returned to local non-league football.

Blow was married and had eight children. He died in London in 1938 at the age of 60.

Notes

References

1877 births
1938 deaths
Sportspeople from Lincoln, England
English footballers
Association football wing halves
Lincoln City F.C. players
English Football League players